Isaac "Ike" Boettger (born October 5, 1994) is an American football guard for the Buffalo Bills of the National Football League (NFL). He played college football at Iowa.

High school career 
At Cedar Falls High School in Cedar Falls, Iowa, Boettger played tight end, wide receiver, quarterback and defensive back. He was lightly recruited, but impressed Iowa coaches at a junior camp despite weighing only 220 pounds. As a junior quarterback, he threw for 750 yards, 9 touchdowns, and one interception. As a senior tight end, he had 33 receptions for 452 yards and 4 touchdowns. Boettger was a team captain in both basketball and football. Boettger was teammates with Alabama and NFL lineman Ross Pierschbacher at Cedar Falls HS.

College career 
After redshirting in 2013, Boettger played four seasons at Iowa. He was healthy his freshman year, seeing reserve time and action as a blocking tight end. In 2015, Boettger started at right tackle in the first six games in the Hawkeyes' Big Ten West championship season before missing the remainder of the season due to injury. He returned in 2016, starting all but one game at tackle, winning honorable mention all-Big Ten and Hawkeye Comeback Player of the Year honors. In 2017, Boettger started the first two games of the season, including a 24-3 win against eventual teammate Josh Allen and Wyoming, before missing the remainder of the season with an achilles injury. Boettger was replaced at the right tackle position by true freshman Tristan Wirfs.

Professional career

Buffalo Bills
Boettger signed with the Buffalo Bills as an undrafted free agent on May 11, 2018. He was waived on September 1, 2018.

Kansas City Chiefs
On September 2, 2018, Boettger was claimed off waivers by the Kansas City Chiefs. He was waived on September 11, 2018.

Buffalo Bills (second stint)
On September 12, 2018, Boettger was claimed off waivers from the Kansas City Chiefs. He made his NFL debut on December 2, 2018 against the Miami Dolphins.

The Bills placed a restricted free agent tender on Boettger on March 17, 2021. He signed the one-year contract on April 27.

Boettger’s 2021 training camp was delayed because he came down with COVID-19 and missed most of the first two weeks. He was named a backup guard to start the season, and then named the starting left guard in Week 8 following an injury to Jon Feliciano. He suffered a torn Achilles in Week 16 and was placed on injured reserve on December 27.

On March 28, 2022, the Bills re-signed Boettger to a one year contract. He was placed on the reserve/PUP list to start the season on August 23, 2022. On December 19, Boettger was activated from reserve/PUP. He was activated on December 19.

On March 3, 2023, the Bills re-signed Boettger to a one year contract.

References

External links
Iowa Hawkeyes bio

1994 births
Living people
American football offensive guards
Buffalo Bills players
Iowa Hawkeyes football players
Kansas City Chiefs players
People from Cedar Falls, Iowa
Players of American football from Iowa